Aldo Marelli (April 17, 1919 – June 8, 2010), was an Italian professional football player. He played professionally for 6 teams from 1938 until 1951, starting his career with Genova and finishing with Gallaratese.

He has been an eclectic defender of Pro Patria during the 40'. Marelli was grown in the juvenile sector of the team by his town, followed by Caimi sr, with Merlo, Borra Giovanni and Enrico Candiani, further to a daring team of skilled soccer players that they contributed to hold tall the coat of arms. Good Methodist defender, redeemed him in the three roles of the median and, with the number 5, had the opportunity to play three games with the Juventus in Serie A (1942/43) with Sentimenti IV, Foni, Rava, Depetrini, Locatelli, Borel II, Meazza and Lustha. He returned to the team of Busto Arsizio after 1943 and in the mixed championship 1945 B/C, it covered, with worth, the role of right “terzino”. Absent, for alone accident in three occasions, he disputed, the following year, 36 matches on 42, contributing to the promotion of Pro Patria, in Series A at the end of season 1946-47. He was also confirmed in the following season, but unfortunately cause the application of the system to the structure biancoblù, didn't have the opportunity to express the anticipated dowries of sense of timing to the best from the method, replaced by the careful and untiring playing to man, anticipated from the new typology of game acquired by Pro Patria. It passed to the Empoli that adopted the “half system” and it was found to wonder embodying the role of free forerunner, had adopted then since 1950 in from the best structures of Serie A. For three years he played in the Gallaratese, then in the Aosta and for the last to the Varese. He had trainer of several teams of “Altomilanese”

References

1919 births
Year of death missing
People from Busto Arsizio
Italian footballers
Serie A players
Genoa C.F.C. players
Aurora Pro Patria 1919 players
Juventus F.C. players
Empoli F.C. players
Association football midfielders
S.G. Gallaratese A.S.D. players
Sportspeople from the Province of Varese
Footballers from Lombardy